August Herman Andresen (October 11, 1890 – January 14, 1958) was an American lawyer and politician from Minnesota. He served in the U.S. Congress as a Republican for thirty-one years.

Background
August Herman Andresen was born in Newark, Illinois to Reverend Ole and Anna Andresen. He graduated from St. Olaf College in 1912 and William Mitchell College of Law (then the St. Paul College of Law) in 1914.

Career
Andresen was first elected to Congress in 1925, serving the third district from 1925–1933, in the 69th, 70th, 71st, and 72nd congresses, and the first district from 1935 – 1958, in the 74th, 75th, 76th, 77th, 78th, 79th, 80th, 81st, 82nd, 83rd, 84th, and 85th congresses.

In 1947-8, he served on the Herter Committee.

By 1948, Andresen was the ranking member of the House Agriculture Committee. In 1952, Andresen had been one of President Dwight D. Eisenhower's finalists for Secretary of Agriculture, but Andresen declined to give up his seat. Andresen voted in favor of the Civil Rights Act of 1957.

Personal life and death
in 1914. He married Julia Lien the same year.

August H. Andresen died age 67 on January 14, 1958.

See also
 List of United States Congress members who died in office (1950–99)

References

Other sources

External links
 
 

1890 births
1958 deaths
People from Kendall County, Illinois
Minnesota lawyers
People from Red Wing, Minnesota
American Lutherans
St. Olaf College alumni
William Mitchell College of Law alumni
Republican Party members of the United States House of Representatives from Minnesota
American people of Norwegian descent
20th-century American politicians
20th-century American lawyers
20th-century Lutherans